Nitrosomonas marina is an ammonia-oxidizing, aerobe, gram-negative bacterium from the genus of Nitrosomonas.

References

Nitrosomonadaceae
Bacteria described in 2001